Amphistichus is a genus of surfperches native to the eastern Pacific Ocean.

Species
There are currently three recognized species in this genus:
 Amphistichus argenteus Agassiz, 1854 (Barred surfperch)
 Amphistichus koelzi (C. L. Hubbs, 1933) (Calico surfperch)
 Amphistichus rhodoterus (Agassiz, 1854) (Redtail surfperch)

References

 
Embiotocidae
Marine fish genera
 
 
Taxa named by Louis Agassiz